Sterphus janzeni is a species of Hoverfly in the family Syrphidae.

Distribution
Costa Rica.

References

Eristalinae
Insects described in 1994
Diptera of South America
Taxa named by F. Christian Thompson